Joe O'Connor (born 1967 in Ballybrown, County Limerick) is an Irish former hurler who played for his local club Ballybrown and at senior level for the Limerick county team in the 1980s and 1990s.

References

1967 births
Living people
Ballybrown hurlers
Irish electricians
Limerick inter-county hurlers